The National Order of Merit was founded by King Jigme Khesar Namgyal Wangchuck on 7 November 2008.

Award 
It is awarded as reward for distinguished and meritorious services to the state.

Ranks 
It is composed of three classes : 

 First Class - a chest medal in gold.
 Second Class - a chest medal in silver. 
 Third Class - a chest medal in bronze.

Insignia 
The badge of the medal is a medallion with right-profile image of the King, inside an eight-petals stylised flower, itself inside an eight-pointed stylised star, simply hanging from a ribbon. The whole medal is in gold, silver or bronze, according to the rank.

The ribbon of the medal is dark orange with lighter orange borders

Notable recipients 
Bhutan Observer, Bhutan's first private bilingual newspaper [in Gold] (17 December 2011).
 Sonam Kinga, Chairperson of National Council (current position), Actor and Researcher at the Center for Bhutan Studies [in Gold] (17 December 2014).
 Harald Nestroy, Ambassador and Chairman of the society Pro Bhutan (17 December 2015).
 Sanduk Ruit, Doctor, eye surgeon (17 December 2015).
 Royal Textile Academy of Bhutan [in Gold] (17 December 2016).
 Chablop Passang Tshering (17 December 2016).
 Toeb Karma (17 December 2021).
 Bhutan Association of Women Entrepreneurs, whose founder and president is Damchae Dem (17 December 2016).
 Bhutan Red Cross Society (BRCS) (17 December 2021).

References 

Orders, decorations, and medals of Bhutan
Awards established in 2008
2008 establishments in Bhutan
Orders of merit